Charles Azzopardi (21 December 1930 – 28 October 1970) was a Maltese footballer.

Club career
A centre-forward or right winger, Azzopardi was part of the famous Floriana side of the 1950s, winning three league titles, two FA Trophy medals and a Cassar Cup with them. He then had a two-year spell at Rabat FC before returning to Floriana where he retired at only 26 years of age.

International career
Azzopardi was part of the Maltese FA U-20 team at the Palermo Youth Tournament in 1949–50. He also played 10 times for a Maltese FA XI, a few years before Malta played his first official international game.

Personal life
His father George Azzopardi also played for Floriana as well as his uncles Manwel and Tony. Charlie died in 1970, just two months short of his 40th birthday.

Honours

Floriana
Maltese Premier League:4
 1950, 1951, 1952 , 1953

Maltese FA Trophy: 2
 1949, 1950

External links
 Biography – Times of Malta

1930 births
1970 deaths
People from Floriana
Association football forwards
Maltese footballers
Floriana F.C. players
Rabat Ajax F.C. players